"Juice" is a song by New Zealand rock band Headless Chickens, released as a single in 1992. The track was originally titled "Dreamchild", having been written and performed by Fiona McDonald for Strawpeople. When McDonald later joined the Headless Chickens, the song was reworked and renamed "Juice". It was released as a double A-side with "Choppers" and peaked at number seven on the New Zealand Singles Chart, staying on the chart for 15 weeks. In Australia, the track was voted in at number 44 on the Triple J Hottest 100 of 1993. In 1994, a 12-inch vinyl disc was issued in the United Kingdom featuring two remixes by Ollie J.

Track listings
Australasian CD and cassette single
 "Juice"
 "Choppers"
 "Choppers" (Heli-Bator mix)
 "Play It Again, Kiri"

UK 12-inch single
A. "Juice" (Ollie J 12-inch mix)
B. "Juice" (Ollie J 12-inch dub original mix)

Credits and personnel
Credits are lifted from the Body Blow album booklet.

Studios
 Recorded at mixed in September 1992 at Platinum Studios (Melbourne, Australia)
 Mastered at Precision Mastering (Los Angeles)

Personnel

 Fiona McDonald – writing, vocals, keyboards
 Mark Tierney – writing
 Paul Casserly – writing
 Chris Matthews – vocals, guitars, keyboards, programs
 Bevan Sweeney – drums, programs
 Michael Lawry – keyboards, programs
 Anthony Nevison – vocals, guitars, bass, keyboards, programs
 Grant Fell – bass, keyboards
 Rex Visible – keyboards, programs
 Angus McNaughton – programs
 Russell "Jimmy" McGregor – strings
 Cate Gray – strings
 Graeme McKean – strings
 Tanya Hardy-Smith – strings
 Michael Koppelman – production, engineering
 Phil "Feel" Jones – assistant engineering

Charts

Weekly charts

Year-end charts

References

1992 singles
1992 songs
Flying Nun Records singles
Headless Chickens songs
Mushroom Records singles